Mount Neva may refer to:

Mount Neva (Colorado)
Mount Neva (Nevada)